Asier Maeztu Villalabeitia (born 14 October 1977) is a Spanish cyclist. He had his best achievements in track cycling, in the 4000 m team pursuit. In this discipline he won a bronze medal at the 2004 Summer Olympics and at the 2004 UCI Track Cycling World Championships. His team finished in seventh place at the 2008 Olympics.

References

1977 births
Living people
Cyclists from the Basque Country (autonomous community)
Spanish male cyclists
Olympic cyclists of Spain
Cyclists at the 2004 Summer Olympics
Cyclists at the 2008 Summer Olympics
Olympic medalists in cycling
Olympic bronze medalists for Spain
Sportspeople from San Sebastián
Medalists at the 2004 Summer Olympics
Spanish track cyclists